, also known as Kazuto Yamamoto, was a former professional baseball infielder and manager in the Japan Baseball League (JBL) and Nippon Professional Baseball (NPB). 

Tsuroka played for the same franchise in 1939, and from 1946 to 1952, which during his career changed names from the Nankai Club to Kinki Great Ring, and ultimately to the Nankai Hawks. (Tsuroka did not play professional baseball from 1940 to 1945.) In 1939 he won the JBL home run title with 10. Returning to the JBL after World War II, in 1946 he won the JBL Most Valuable Player Award, repeating the feat in 1948. His team won the JBL championship both those years.

In 1949, he was named player-manager of the Hawks. His playing career ended after the 1952 season, but he stayed on as the team's manager through the 1968 season, guiding the team to Japan Series championships in 1959 and 1964. His managerial record overall was 1773–1140, for a winning percentage of .609.

Tsuroka was elected by the Selection Committee for the Players to the Japanese Baseball Hall of Fame in 1965.

References

External links

1916 births
2000 deaths
Baseball people from Hiroshima Prefecture
Hosei University alumni
Japanese baseball players
Nankai Hawks players
Nippon Professional Baseball MVP Award winners
Managers of baseball teams in Japan
Baseball player-managers
Fukuoka SoftBank Hawks managers
Japanese Baseball Hall of Fame inductees